Martin Stokhof (born 1950, Amsterdam) is a Dutch logician and philosopher. Stokhof wrote a joint Ph.D. dissertation with Jeroen Groenendijk on the semantics of questions, under the supervision of Renate Bartsch and Johan van Benthem. He was also an important figure in the development of dynamic semantics (together with Groenendijk, Veltman and others, following work by Irene Heim and Kamp). He is also known for his work on Ludwig Wittgenstein.

He is a former director of the Institute for Logic, Language and Computation at the University of Amsterdam and a member of the group collectively publishing under the pseudonym L. T. F. Gamut.

In 2006 he was elected member of the Royal Netherlands Academy of Arts and Sciences.

References

External links
 Stokhof's homepage

1950 births
Living people
Dutch logicians
20th-century Dutch philosophers
21st-century Dutch philosophers
Members of the Royal Netherlands Academy of Arts and Sciences
Semanticists
Writers from Amsterdam
University of Amsterdam alumni
Academic staff of the University of Amsterdam